Samga Station is a station of the Everline in Samga-dong, Cheoin-gu, Yongin, South Korea.

External links
  Station information from Everline

Everline
Metro stations in Yongin
Railway stations opened in 2013